Rogvold Vasilyevich Sukhoverko (30 October 1941 – 9 April 2015) was a Soviet and Russian film and voice actor.

Biography
Rogvold Sukhoverko was born in Leningrad (now St. Petersburg) on 30 October 1941, to Vasiliy Vasilevich Suhoverko, a military doctor, and Aleksandra Yakovlevna (née Terenteva) Suhoverko.

In 1965, Sukhoverko graduated from the Moscow Art Theatre school (class of Vasily Markov). In the same year he joined the troupe of the Sovremennik Theatre, where he worked for many years. He also worked in radio, and as a dubbing actor. He had voice-acted in numerous domestic and foreign animated cartoons, feature films, and, as well, in computer games. In 2008, the publishing house Zebra E released Rogvold Sukhoverko's book of memories, Zigzagi, which is about the Sovremennik Theatre, and his radio and stage activities.

Sukhoverko possessed a basso profondo, but almost lost his voice due to illness. From 2005 on, he did not take the voice acting anymore. His last theatrical appearance was made on 4 April 2015. On 9 April 2015, he died in Moscow after a long struggle with his illness, despite which he continued to play at the theatre. A farewell ceremony of Rogvold Sukhoverko was held on 11 April 2015 at the main stage of the Sovremennik Theatre.

Personal life
He has a son, Anton Sukhoverko (b. 1969), who is an economist, and also known for his child role as Kolya Sulima in the TV miniseries Guest from the Future, and a daughter, Aleksandra Sukhoverko (b. 1973).

Filmography

As actor

Theatre

Film

As voice actor

Film

Animated cartoon

Television series

Video game

Radio

References

External links
 

1941 births
2015 deaths
Male actors from Saint Petersburg
Honored Artists of the Russian Federation
Russian male film actors
Russian male voice actors
Soviet male film actors
Soviet male voice actors
Moscow Art Theatre School alumni